Pokeweed may refer to several species of genus Phytolacca:

Phytolacca americana, or American pokeweed
Phytolacca acinosa, or Indian pokeweed
Phytolacca sandwicensis, or Hawai'i pokeweed
Phytolacca pruinosa, or Levantine pokeweed

See also
Phytolaccaceae, also known as the Pokeweed family